The genus Calyptra is a group of moths in subfamily Calpinae of the family Erebidae. They are a member of the Calpini tribe, whose precise circumscription is uncertain but which includes a number of other fruit-piercing or eye-frequenting genera currently classified in Calpinae.

Etymology
The common name of many of these species, vampire moth, refers to the habit that they have of drinking blood from vertebrates. According to a recent study, some of them (C. thalictri) are even capable of drinking human blood through skin. However, the moths are not thought to cause any threat to humans.

Some species of this genus have been classified with genus name Calpe, and they include more than one blood-sucker.

Description
Palpi porrect (extending forward), where the second joint and third joint fringed below with very long hair. The frontal tuft is large, with the metathorax having only very slight tufts. The abdomen features coarse hair on the dorsum; the tibia is spineless, but slightly hairy. The forewings have slightly arched costa. The apex is acute, with the outer margin excurved at vein 3. The inner margin is lobed near the base and at the outer angle. The larvae of the Calyptra moth have three pairs of abdominal prolegs.

Habitat
The Calyptra moth has been observed as changing its habitat in recent years; the species Calyptra thalictri was originally native to Malaysia, the Urals and southern Europe, but has been found in northern Europe. In 2000, they were observed in Finland and in 2008 they were seen further west in Sweden. The Swedish observation was in Skutskär, north of the capital of Stockholm, whilst the sightings in Finland have been more numerous. It is found in southern Finland, in particular in the south east.

The moth Calyptra thalictri has been seen to be associated with the plant meadow-rue.

Penetrating skin
Insects piercing the skin of mammals are familiar in creatures such as mosquitoes, but the moth uses a specially developed proboscis to penetrate the skin of animals, such as buffalo. A species in Malaysia was observed using its hollowed out proboscis which is divided into two halves. The insect rocks the proboscis from one side to the other, applying pressure until it pierces the skin. It then uses a rocking head motion to drill the tube deeper into the skin. The blood pressure of the victim supplies power to raise hooks on the proboscis to ensure the insect is not easily detached. Only male moths exhibit this ability, unlike mosquitoes, where the female is the one that drinks blood.

It is thought that the moth's ability to pierce animal skin and drink blood may have sprung from an earlier ability to pierce fruit in search of juice. Human skin penetrated in this way may turn red and be sore for several hours leaving an itchy rash. Despite the bite being more severe than that of a mosquito, the moths do not pose a risk to humans.

Although it has been reported that moths have bitten humans in Asia, it was not until the summer of 1999 that a Russian scientist, Vladimir Kononenko, observed that this species of moth was capable of filling its stomach with human blood.

Species

 Calyptra albivirgata Hampson, 1926
 Calyptra bicolor Moore, 1883
 Calyptra canadensis Bethune, 1865 – Canadian owlet moth
 Calyptra eustrigata Hampson, 1926
 Calyptra fasciata Moore, 1882
 Calyptra fletcheri Berio, 1956
 Calyptra gruesa Draudt, 1950
 Calyptra hokkaida Wileman, 1922
 Calyptra imperialis Grünberg, 1910
 Calyptra lata Butler, 1881
 Calyptra minuticornis Guenée, 1852
 Calyptra nyei Bänziger, 1979
 Calyptra ophideroides Guenée, 1852
 Calyptra orthograpta Butler, 1886
 Calyptra parva Bänziger, 1979
 Calyptra pseudobicolor Bänziger, 1979
 Calyptra subnubila Prout, 1928
 Calyptra thalictri Borkhausen, 1790)

References

External links

Calpinae
Hematophages
Moth genera